The Nor Cal Red Hawks are a women's football team based in Redding, California. They are members of the Independent Women's Football League. They played in 2010 as an exhibition team and began play of their first regular season in 2011 in Sacramento. However, injuries postponed their 2011 season. There is one other women's football team in Redding, who are in the same league as the Red Hawks: the Redding Rage. It was announced in 2012 that the team would relocate to Redding for 2013. The Red Hawks will now play in the IWFL's Pacific West division, along with the California Quake.

Players
There were 13 players listed on the 2011 team roster. However, recruiting for the Red Hawks is still ongoing.

2013 schedule

Season by season

|-
| colspan="6" align="center" |Nor Cal Red Hawks (IWFL)
|-
|2010 || 0 || 3 || 0 || N/A || (exhibition)
|-
|2011 || 0 || 1 || 0 || N/A || (cancelled)
|-
|2012 || Did not play ||
|-
|2013 || 0 || 1 || 0 || N/A

References

External links
 Nor Cal Red Hawks Official Website
 IWFL Official Website

Independent Women's Football League
American football teams in California
Redding, California
American football teams established in 2009
2009 establishments in California
Women's sports in California